Enyedi is a Hungarian surname. Notable people with the surname include:

Alexander Enyedi, Canadian plant biologist and academic administrator

 Ildikó Enyedi (born 1955), Hungarian film director and screenwriter

Hungarian-language surnames